Poonthottam Achhan Nambudiri (also known as Poonthottam Parameshwaran Nambudiri) (1821-1865) was a poet of the Venmani School of Malayalam Literature.

Nambudiri was born in 1821 in Killikkurussimangalam, Palakkad district.  He was a close friend and associate of Venmani Achhan Nambudiripad from Kodungalloor.

Nambudiri was a talented poet whose works include Ambareesha Charitham (Ottan Thullal), Kaalakeya Vadham (Seethankan Thullal), Syamanthakam (Aattakkathha) and a few Muktakams.  His son Damodaran Nambudiri was also a poet and was known as Poonthottam Mahan Nambudiri.

References 
 Malayalam literature at namboothiri.com.

1821 births
1865 deaths
Malayalam-language writers
19th-century Indian poets